Joseph Patrick McNamara is an American politician. He represents the Virginia's 8th district , which includes the City of Salem, Craig County, and parts of Roanoke and Montgomery Counties. He was sworn in on November 26, 2018, after Greg Habeeb announced he would resign.

McNamara is an accountant and the only licensed CPA in the Virginia House of Delegates. Additionally, he owns an ice cream shop in Salem, Virginia.

Elections

References

Republican Party members of the Virginia House of Delegates
1963 births
Living people